"Revival" is a 1989 song by the British pop music duo Eurythmics. It was written by group members Annie Lennox and David A. Stewart, along with keyboardist Pat Seymour and vocalist Charlie Wilson (of the Gap Band) who also sang backing vocals for the track. Produced by Stewart and Jimmy Iovine, it was the first single to be released from Eurythmics' 1989 album We Too Are One.

Lennox and Stewart returned to a rock/R&B sound for the album, and "Revival" is an uptempo tune which lyrically is a call for renewal and encouragement. The single reached number 26 in the UK, and was the duo's sixteenth (and final) top 20 single in Australia. "Revival" was not released as a single in the United States. In 1990, there was a cover version in Cantonese titled 乖乖 by Yolinda Yan that reached number 3 in the pop charts in Hong Kong.

Track listing
UK 7" single
 "Revival" (LP Version) - 4:09
 "Precious" (non-LP track) - 3:40

UK 12" single / CD single
 "Revival" (E.T. Dance Mix) - 6:25
 "Revival" (LP Version) - 4:09
 "Precious" (non-LP track) - 3:40

* The B-side track, "Precious", is a Eurythmics composition and is unrelated to the 1992 solo track by Annie Lennox.

Charts

References 

1989 songs
1989 singles
Eurythmics songs
RCA Records singles
Songs written by David A. Stewart
Songs written by Annie Lennox
Song recordings produced by Jimmy Iovine
Songs written by Charlie Wilson (singer)
Songs written by Patrick Seymour
Song recordings produced by Dave Stewart (musician and producer)